Gjerøy or Gjerdøya is an island in the municipality of Rødøy in Nordland county, Norway.  It is located in a group of islands located west of the peninsula between the Tjongsfjorden and Melfjorden.  It lies south of the island of Rødøya, north of the island of Rangsundøya, and west of the island of Renga.  The main village on the island is called Gjerøy.  The  island has a population (2016) of 87 people.  There is regular ferry service to Gjerdøya from the mainland and to the islands surrounding it.

See also
List of islands of Norway

References

Islands of Nordland
Villages in Nordland
Populated places of Arctic Norway
Rødøy